Aliens is an American men's 3-on-3 basketball team that plays in the BIG3. They were the second team announced in the 2019 BIG3 expansion and are led by former first overall pick in the 2018 BIG3 draft Andre Owens, who placed top seven in blocks and assists in 2018.

2019

Draft

2021

Draft

2022

Draft

Season-by-season record

Game log

|- style="background:#fbb;"
| 1 || June 23 || Triplets || 40–50 || Rush (13) || Rush (8) || Owens (4) || Bankers Life Fieldhouse || 0–1
|- style="background:#fbb;"
| 2 || June 30 || 3 Headed Monsters || 44–50 || Rush (15) || Rush (6) || Owens (2) || Liacouras Center || 0–2
|- style="background:#cfc;"
| 3 || July 6 || Ball Hogs || 51–39 || Oden (18) || Rush (12) || Oden, Rush, Owens, Hollins, Vaden (1) || Legacy Arena || 1–2
|- style="background:#fbb;"
| 4 || July 13 || Enemies || 39–50 || Oden (11) || Rush (7) || Hollins, Owens (2) || Dunkin' Donuts Center || 1–3
|- style="background:#cfc;"
| 5 || July 21 || Ghost Ballers || 51–35 || Brown (18) || Brown (10) || Rush (4) || Chesapeake Energy Arena || 2–3
|- style="background:#fbb;"
| 6 || July 27 || Bivouac || 47–50 || Rush (23) || Oden (8) || Oden (3) || Vivint Smart Home Arena || 2–4
|- style="background:#cfc;"
| 7 || August 3 || 3's Company || 50–35 || Oden (18) || Oden (9) || Rush, Owens (3) || Fiserv Forum || 3–4
|- style="background:#fbb;"
| 8 || August 17 || Tri-State || 44–51 || Rush, Owens (11) || Oden (9) || Owens (4) || American Airlines Center || 3–5
|-

|- style="background:#fbb;"
| 1 || July 10 || Ghost Ballers || 45–51 || Balkman (14) || Balkman (14) || Owens (3) || Orleans Arena || 0–1
|- style="background:#fbb;"
| 2 || July 18 || Ball Hogs || 42–51 || Rush, Owens (16) || Rush (12) || Rush, Owens, Balkman, Brown (1) || Orleans Arena || 0–2
|- style="background:#fbb;"
| 3 || July 24 || Killer 3's || 47–50 || Rush (22) || Owens (8) || Rush (3) || Orleans Arena || 0–3
|- style="background:#fbb;"
| 4 || July 31 || Trilogy || 32–50 || Owens (12) || Oden (11) || Owens, Oden, Rush (1) || American Airlines Center || 0–4
|- style="background:#cfc;"
| 5 || August 5 || Enemies || 50–42 || Brown, Owens (14) || Maxiell (13) || Rush (3) || Fiserv Forum || 1–4
|- style="background:#cfc;"
| 6 || August 7 || Power || 50–45 || Owens (14) || Oden (8) || Owens (2) || Credit Union 1 Arena || 2–4
|-

Current roster

References

Big3 teams
Basketball teams established in 2019
2019 establishments in the United States